Long Island is located in Queen Charlotte Sound, one of the Marlborough Sounds of New Zealand. James Cook recorded its original name as Hamote.

It was reserved for public utility on 26 March 1926 and soon after became a farm which ran between 300 and 400 sheep until 14 January 1926 when the island became a scenic reserve. With the removal of stock in the 1930s the island has been left to regenerate back into native bush.

In April 1993, the Long Island-Kokomohua Marine reserve was created around Long island and the tiny Kokomohua islands off its northern tip. The island itself is also an important wildlife refuge and a number of species of threatened endemic birds which have been reintroduced to it including little spotted kiwi (late 1980s), yellow-crowned parakeet (2001) and South Island saddleback (2005) - all these reintroductions have been successful with healthy breeding populations of each species now present on the Island.

See also

 List of islands of New Zealand
 List of islands
 Desert island

References

Uninhabited islands of New Zealand
Islands of the Marlborough Sounds